Carol Harrison (born 8 February 1955) is an English actress and writer. She is known mostly for her work on British television, in particular her role as Louise Raymond in BBC's EastEnders.

Career
Harrison made her acting debut in 1976, in the BBC police drama, Softly Softly, which was a spin-off from the hugely popular Z-Cars. In 1980 she made her film debut, securing a minor role in the 1980 adaptation of The Elephant Man. She went on to appear in many successful television programmes including The Gentle Touch (1982); Q.E.D. (1982); The Cleopatras (1983); Minder (1984); Casualty (1987, 1996 & 2008); Dorothy in London's Burning from 1988–1989; Kavanagh QC (1995); The Bill (1995) and ITV's A Touch of Frost (1997).

One of her most notable and long running roles, was playing the part of Gloria in the BBC sitcom Brush Strokes (1986–1991); remaining in the role for five series. However, it is her role in the BBC soap opera EastEnders (1998–1999) that she is most remembered for. Harrison played Louise Raymond, the selfish mother of Tiffany (Martine McCutcheon) and Simon (Andrew Lynford). Harrison's character was involved in several storylines, including an affair with her daughter's husband Grant (Ross Kemp). This role was not the first time Harrison had appeared in the soap. She had previously had a minor role in 1986, playing the mother of a young boy who was rescued from a speeding lorry by Andy O'Brien (Ross Davidson).

Harrison left EastEnders in 1999 so she could take a Master's degree in screenwriting. In 2006 she began teaching Script and Screen, a five-week course offered through the adult and community non-accredited provision, at Brighton and Hove College.

Harrison's other acting credits include the cult films Tank Malling (1989) and Human Traffic (1999), and the ITV police drama The Bill (1995 & 2002). In 2005 she also took part in the Channel 4 series Extreme Celebrity Detox.

She took part in TV series Celebrity Coach Trip partnered with friend Ingrid Tarrant.

In 2016, Harrison wrote and produced the mod musical All or Nothing, based on the life of Steve Marriott, of whom she had been a fan since 1965 when he appeared with the Small Faces at a concert in Chesterfield, Derbyshire. Her musical toured around the country in 2016 and 2017, receiving positive reviews, before closing early after a short run at the Ambassadors Theatre in London's West End.

Personal life
Harrison was born in West Ham to a working-class, single parent family. She failed her 11-plus exams in her youth and later discovered that she is dyslexic. Harrison was once married to the actor Jamie Foreman, son of the 1960s London gangster Freddie Foreman. They have a son named Alfie.

References

External links 

Carol Harrison interview

1955 births
Living people
English television actresses
English film actresses
English soap opera actresses
English dramatists and playwrights
Screenwriting instructors
People from West Ham
Actors with dyslexia
Writers with dyslexia